Mud Men is a British television series on the History channel, following members of the Mudlarks Society as they hunt for items on the River Thames foreshore. The series is presented by Johnny Vaughan and Steve "Mud God" Brooker, chairman of the Mudlarks Society. In the third season, the last of the series to air, Nick "Rock" Stevens had a recurring role.

Format
The first half of the show is spent searching the Foreshore. After the search, they are joined by their expert who then gives them a historical research "mission" based on their finds.

References

External links
 Official website
 Thames & Field

History (European TV channel) original programming
2011 British television series debuts